Belval-Rédange railway station is a railway station serving the neighbourhood of Belval, in the west of Esch-sur-Alzette, in southern Luxembourg.  The 'Rédange' in the name is a reference to the French town of Rédange, which lies just across the border.  The station is operated by Chemins de Fer Luxembourgeois, the state-owned railway company.

The station is situated on Line 60, which connects Luxembourg City to the Red Lands of the south of the country.

External links
 Official CFL page on Belval-Rédange station
 Rail.lu page on Belval-Rédange station

Railway stations in Esch-sur-Alzette
Railway stations on CFL Line 60